Nick Zangwill (born 1957) is a British philosopher and  honorary research professor at University College London and Lincoln University. He is known for his expertise on moral philosophy (especially metaethics), and aesthetics (especially the philosophy of music and visual art).

He has also written on metaphysics, epistemology, the philosophy of mind, and logic.

Background

In metaethics, Zangwill has defended non-naturalism, with a special attention to dependence of morality on natural properties. He has defended externalism about moral motivation, developed aspects of expressivism, and defended non-consequentialist theory. 

In aesthetics, Zangwill has defined his position as 'moderate formalism' in art as referring to those properties "that are determined solely by sensory or physical properties—so long as the physical properties in question are not relations to other things and other times." The philosopher and architect Branko Mitrovic has defined formalism in art and architecture as "the doctrine that states that the aesthetic qualities of works of visual art derive from the visual and spatial properties."

Philosophical views

On meat eating

Zangwill has criticized animal rights and vegetarianism and has stated that "vegetarians and vegans are the natural enemies of domesticated animals that are bred to be eaten". In his 2021 paper Our Moral Duty to Eat Meat which was published in the Journal of the American Philosophical Association, Zangwill argues that the existence of domesticated animals depends on the practice of eating them, and that meat eating has historically benefitted many millions of animals and given them good lives. Consequently, he claims that eating non-human animal meat is not merely permissible but also good for many millions of animals. However, Zangwill clarifies that this argument does not apply to factory farm animals, as they do not have good lives. Thus, when he speaks of meat eating being justified, he means only meat from animals that overall have a good life. Zangwill has commented that "I think a lot of the domesticated animals lives are a lot better than your average animal lives. They’re waited on by human beings, they don’t have to do much. We get rid of their predators. We provide them food, we provide them even romance."

Philosophy of music

In the 21st century, philosophers such as Zangwill have extended the study of aesthetics in music, as studied in the 20th century by scholars such as Jerrold Levinson and Peter Kivy. In his 2015 book on the aesthetics of music titled Music and Aesthetic Reality: Formalism and the Limits of Description, Zangwill introduces his realist position by stating, "By 'realism' about musical experience, I mean a view that foregrounds the aesthetic properties of music and our experience of these properties: musical experience is an awareness of an array of sounds and of the aesthetic properties that they determine. Our experience is directed onto the sound structure and its aesthetic properties. This is the content of musical experience."

Philosophy of mind

Zangwill defends a particular 'weak' version of the idea that the mental is essentially normative, as well as the anomalism of the mental.

Philosophy of logic

Zangwill defends realism about logic and attacks inferentialism.

Selected publications 

 The Metaphysics of Beauty (Cornell UP, 2001)
 Aesthetic Creation (Oxford UP, 2007)
 Music and Aesthetic Reality: Formalism and the Limits of Description (Routledge, 2015)
 Scruton's Aesthetics (ed., with Andy Hamilton) (Palgrave Macmillan, 2012)
 Our Moral Duty to Eat Meat (Journal of the American Philosophical Association, 2021)

References

External links 
 Prof Nick Zangwill

1957 births
20th-century British male writers
20th-century British philosophers
20th-century educators
20th-century essayists
21st-century British male writers
21st-century British philosophers
21st-century educators
21st-century essayists
Action theorists
Alumni of the University of London
Analytic philosophers
Architectural theoreticians
British art critics
British art historians
British ethicists
British literary critics
British literary theorists
British logicians
British male essayists
British male non-fiction writers
British music theorists
Critics of animal rights
Critics of veganism
Critics of vegetarianism
Descartes scholars
Epistemologists
Hume scholars
Kant scholars
Literacy and society theorists
Living people
Mass media theorists
Media critics
Metaphysicians
Ontologists
Philosophers of art
Philosophers of culture
Philosophers of literature
Philosophers of logic
Philosophers of mind
Philosophers of social science
Philosophy academics
Philosophers of music
Philosophy writers
Social philosophers
Trope theorists